Mohsen Namjoo is an Iranian singer-songwriter, composer and musician. His style of music is influenced by blues and rock as well as Iranian folk music.

Early life and education
Namjoo was born on 4 March 1976 in Torbat-e Jam, a small town of Razavi Khorasan in northeastern Iran. He was raised in the religious city of Mashhad. He started learning classical Persian music when he was 12. At a young age, he started listening to Western music and became interested in musicians like Jim Morrison, Eric Clapton, and Chris de Burgh.

He was admitted to the Tehran University of Art in 1994.

Career
In late 1997 and early 1998, Namjoo had his first two concerts, themed "modern combination of Iranian poetry and music". In 2003 he started recording parts of his works in Tehran. His debut album titled Toranj was officially released in Iran in September 2007 and got his first captivated Iranians' attention. This album mostly produced underground music and was very well-received among the Iranian community. This album insulted the Islamic regime, which forced him into exile in 2008.

He also composed soundtracks for movies and plays. In 2010, Namjoo kicked off his "A Minor" tour with a new band ensemble centered around some of his most popular and courageous songs. They performed at the Walt Disney Concert Hall in Los Angeles, California (US) in June. They performed at the Sony Center in Toronto, Ontario, Canada in October. Mohsen Namjoo also released a single entitled "Such Strange Times" in June, a song sung in English.

In fall of 2011, Namjoo recorded his next album Alaki live during his concert in Stanford University. This album was part of his work in the Stanford Pan Asian Music Festival. The accompanying band consisted of Ali Bazyar (Percussion), Dina Zarif (back vocal), Tannaz Jaffari (back vocal), Serwah Tabbak (back vocal), Siamack Sanaie (Guitar), Mark Deutsch: (Bazantar, Guitar)

In fall of 2012, Namjoo released his new album, 13/8. Thirteen/eight is a compilation of six pieces that were developed in the United States during the previous year. The performance had been prepared in collaboration with California-based musicians James Riotto (Contrabass), Robert Shelton (Keyboard), Ezra Lipp (Drums) and Greg Ellis (Percussion). Payam Entertainment produced a series of live performances for 2012. The inaugural performance in Berkeley, California, will be recorded in preparation for a future double-album release by the same title.

Since late 2013, Mohsen Namjoo has been at Brown University Middle East Studies' 2014 Artist in Residence. During his residency, he is engaging in a number of activities. On December 7, 2013, to kick off his residency, he performed  at the Granoff Center for the Creative Arts. In spring 2014, he taught the course “Tradition and Protest: Persian and Iranian Music,” and gave several musical talks to public audiences on topics including “Shahram Shabpareh: Honesty and Minor Scale” and Iranian Rhythms. The spring 2014 semester was capped by a well-attended concert on the evening of May 10.

In the fall of 2014, Namjoo taught “Revolution and Poets: Content and Form in Iranian Poetry.” Organized by Middle East Studies, Brown, he took part in a panel discussion on Protest Music/ Music Performance and Social Change on Thursday, November 13, as well as taking the lead on assembling a couple of Iranian bands, banned from playing in their own country, who came together for the first time in an Iranian Music Festival titled “Iran Underground” on November 15 at RISD Auditorium. The event was part of Brown's 250th Anniversary events.

Namjoo made several film appearances. He was featured in the documentary Sounds of Silence (directed by Amir Hamz and Mark Lazarz) which has been screened at international film festivals. He also appeared in a feature narrative film called Few Kilograms of Dates for the Funeral (Director Saman Saloor), which played in various film festivals. In 2016 he played in the feature film Radio Dreams by Babak Jalali. His newest song named, "Begoo be baran" composed by Ehsan Matoori was released in March 2019 by Sheed Records company. His new album "Phantasm" composed and produced by Ehsan Matoori released on April 27, 2019, in San Francisco. 

In 2009, he received a prison sentence in Iran of five years for making music that "dishonors" content from the Qur'an. Since Namjoo lives abroad, the sentencing was in the absence of the accused.

Discography

Albums
Studio albums

Live albums

Books

Audiobooks
 The Alchemist (by Paulo Coelho), produced by Caravan (publishing), 2008

Books
 Dorrabe Makhdoosh (2017)
 Chahar Maghale (2018)

Theatre
 Jana and Baladoor (2012 - A Play in Shadowzs, directed by Bahram Beyzai)
 Arash (2013 - A Play Reading, directed by Bahram Beyzai)

Filmography

Performance

Philadelphia, U.S. 
2014: Mohsen Namjoo performed with the Al-Bustan Takht Ensemble as part of the Al-Bustan Seeds of Culture concert series.

Stockholm, Sweden 
2020: Mohsen Namjoo Performed with Stockholm Symphony Orchestra.

See also
 Persian traditional music
 Rock and alternative music in Iran

References

External links

 The Innovator Iranian Singer-Songwriter Mohsen Namjoo
 Brown University Middle East Studies

1976 births
Living people
Iranian composers
Iranian musicians
Iranian rock singers
Iranian male singers
Iranian setar players
Iranian blues singers
Iranian rock musicians
People from Torbat-e Jam
Persian-language singers
Kurdish-language singers
Iranian classical singers
Iranian singer-songwriters
Iranian expatriates in the United States